Tetrahydropyran (THP) is the organic compound consisting of a saturated six-membered ring containing five carbon atoms and one oxygen atom.  It is named by reference to pyran, which contains two double bonds, and may be produced from it by adding four hydrogens.  In 2013, its preferred IUPAC name was established as oxane.  The compound is a colourless volatile liquid. Derivatives of tetrahydropyran are, however, more common. 2-Tetrahydropyranyl (THP-) ethers derived from the reaction of alcohols and 3,4-dihydropyran are commonly used as protecting groups in organic synthesis.  Furthermore, a tetrahydropyran ring system, i.e., five carbon atoms and an oxygen, is the core of pyranose sugars, such as glucose.

Structure and preparation
In gas phase, the THP exists in its lowest energy Cs symmetry chair conformation.

One classic procedure for the organic synthesis of tetrahydropyran is by hydrogenation of the 3,4-isomer of dihydropyran with Raney nickel.

Tetrahydropyranyl derivatives
Although tetrahydropyran is an obscure compound, tetrahydropyranyl ethers are commonly used in organic synthesis.  Specifically, the 2-tetrahydropyranyl (THP) group is a common protecting group for alcohols.  Alcohols react with 3,4-dihydropyran to give 2-tetrahydropyranyl ethers.  These ethers are resilient to a variety of reactions.  The alcohol can later be restored by acid-catalyzed hydrolysis.  This hydrolysis reforms the parent alcohol as well as 5-hydroxypentanal. THP ethers derived from chiral alcohols form diastereomers.  Another undesirable feature is that the ethers display complex NMR spectra, which interfere with analysis.

In a typical procedure, the alcohol is treated with 3,4-dihydropyran and p-toluenesulfonic acid in dichloromethane at ambient temperature.

Alternatively, the THP ether can be generated under the conditions akin to those for the Mitsunobu reaction. Thus the alcohol is treated with 2-hydroxytetrahydropyranyl, triphenylphosphine, and diethyl azodicarboxylate (DEAD) in tetrahydrofuran (THF).

Commonly, THP ethers are deprotected using acetic acid in a THF/water solution, p-toluenesulfonic acid in water, or Pyridinium p-toluenesulfonate (PPTS) in ethanol.

Oxanes
Oxanes are the class of hexic cyclic ether rings with tetrahydropyran as the root chemical.  Oxanes have one or more carbon atoms replaced with an oxygen atom.  The IUPAC preferred name for tetrahydropyran is now oxane.

See also
Pyran
Dioxane and Trioxane, which have two and three oxygen atoms as part of their six-membered rings respectively

References 

Protecting groups
Ether solvents